The Watford UTC is a 14–19 University Technical College (UTC) in Watford, England that opened in September 2014. The UTC specialises in Event Management, Hospitality and Computer Science.

The UTC's sponsors are the University of Hertfordshire, Hilton Worldwide (whose European base is in Watford), and Twin Technology who specialise in server provision and virtualisation.

History
It was visited by Ofsted in 2017 and declared a good school. In 2018 it failed to set a balanced budget and had its funding monitored by central government.

The school is tiny, and half empty. In 2021 it is planning to open a Key Stage 3 section, teaching eleven year olds.

The Department for Education has confirmed that The Watford UTC will close at the end of the 2022/2023 academic year.

Courses offered

References

External links
 

UTC
University Technical Colleges
University of Hertfordshire
Educational institutions established in 2014
2014 establishments in England
Secondary schools in Hertfordshire